The Donaciano Vigil House is an adobe house built in 1832 in Santa Fe, New Mexico. It was listed on the National Register of Historic Places in 1972. It was home of Donaciano Vigil, the first Hispanic governor of New Mexico.

It was a very active site of civil and political activity. Vigil lived in the property with his large family. 
The Donaciano Vigil House is a single-story adobe structure with a large interior patio. It is constructed in Territorial style. A restoration of the house began in 1959.

See also

National Register of Historic Places listings in Santa Fe County, New Mexico

References

Buildings and structures in Santa Fe, New Mexico
Houses completed in 1832
Houses on the National Register of Historic Places in New Mexico
Adobe buildings and structures in New Mexico
Mexican-American culture in New Mexico
Spanish-American culture in Santa Fe, New Mexico
Houses in Santa Fe County, New Mexico
National Register of Historic Places in Santa Fe, New Mexico
Historic district contributing properties in New Mexico